"Paul's Case" is a short story by Willa Cather. It was first published in McClure's Magazine in 1905 under the title "Paul's Case: A Study in Temperament", which was later shortened. It also appeared in a collection of Cather's stories, The Troll Garden (1905).  For many years "Paul's Case" was the only one of her stories that Cather allowed to be anthologized.

Overview
New York City was historically known as a destination for those seeking adventure and new opportunities, and often described as a center of fine living and society. It was considered at the time of the publication of "Paul's Case" as “the symbol of ultimate glamour and cosmopolitan sophistication”. Indeed, in the story, New York City is described as lavish and extraordinary, in contrast to the descriptions of Paul's home, Pittsburgh, which he despises.

Paul, a high school student from Pittsburgh, is frustrated with his dull middle-class life. This frustration, mixed with a desire for a luxurious lifestyle, causes him to purposely separate himself from everyone else, leading to feelings of isolation. Paul's teachers and father refer to Paul as a "case", representing him at a distance and as an example of someone to be studied, handled, and managed; the term enables Cather to adopt "the voice of medical authority". Paul seems to display some symptoms of a narcissistic personality disorder, but that is still debated.

Synopsis
The short story "Paul's Case" is about a young boy who struggles to fit in at home and in school. This story begins with the reader finding out the main character, Paul, has been suspended from high school. He meets with his principal and teachers who complain about Paul's "defiant manner" in class, and the "physical aversion" he exhibits toward his teachers. In the evening, Paul works as a "model" usher for Carnegie Hall in Pittsburgh. After helping seat the patrons in his section, he stays for the concert and enjoys the social scene while losing himself in the music. After the concert, Paul follows the soloist and imagines life inside her hotel room. Unfortunately, the reader soon learns that Paul and his father have a poor relationship. Upon returning home very late that night, Paul enters through the basement window to avoid a confrontation with his father. Remaining in the basement, Paul stays awake for the rest of the night, imagining what would happen if his father mistook him for a burglar and shot him. Not only does Paul wonder if his father will recognize him in time, but he also entertains the idea of his father possibly regretting not shooting him when he had the chance to do so.

Paul feels out of place with the people on Cordelia Street because they serve to remind him of his own lackluster life. Although his father considers him a role model for Paul, Paul is unimpressed by a plodding young man who works for an iron company and is married with four children. While Paul longs to be wealthy, cultivated, and powerful, he lacks the stamina and ambition to change his condition. Instead, Paul escapes his monotonous life by visiting Charley Edwards, a young actor. Later on, Paul makes it clear to one of his teachers that his job ushering is more important than his schoolwork, causing his father to prevent him from continuing to work as an usher. He is taken out of school and put to work at an entry-level office job and Charley is compelled to promise not to see Paul again.

Paul takes a train to New York City after stealing a large sum of money from his job that he was supposed to take to the bank. He then buys an expensive wardrobe, rents a room at the Waldorf-Astoria Hotel, and explores the city. He also meets a 'wild San Francisco boy, a freshman at Yale, who said he had run down for a "little flyer" over Sunday', who takes Paul on an all-night tour of the city's lively social scene. His few days of impersonating a rich, privileged young man, bring him more contentment than he had ever known, because living a lavish lifestyle is Paul's only hope and dream. However, on the eighth day, after spending most of his money, Paul reads from a Pittsburgh newspaper that his theft has been made public. His father has reimbursed his job and is on his way to New York City to bring Paul back home to Pittsburgh. Paul then reveals that he had bought a gun on his first day in New York City, and briefly considers shooting himself to avoid returning to his old life in Pittsburgh. Eventually, he decides against it and instead commits suicide by jumping in front of a train. Paul made the ultimate decision of taking his own life because the thought of returning to his old lifestyle was too much for him to handle.

Literary criticism and significance
Paul's Case has been called a "gay suicide".  Many critics have attributed his suicide to the forces of alienation and stigmatization facing a young, possibly homosexual, man in early 20th-century America. In 1975, Larry Rubin wrote The Homosexual Motif which includes the reinterpretation of the story since the stigma on sex has eased. He identifies small details which he claims support a gay reading of Paul. For example, Rubin refers to the way Paul is described as "dressing as a dandy". The violet water (a perfume Paul owns), and his choice of company are construed as signs of feminine tendencies. Jane Nardin also explores the possibility that Paul's character is gay, and that this is a metaphor for a general feeling of being an outsider or not fitting in with a specific group of people. Author Roger Austen states that Paul might be understood as a homosexual character because of the "depiction of a sensitive young man stifled by the drab ugliness of his environment and places the protagonist in an American literary tradition of 'village sissies'".

Wayne Koestenbaum reads the story as a possible portrait of Willa Cather's "own desire for aesthetic fulfillment and sexual nonconformity". Another critic, Tom Quirk, reads it as an exploration of Cather's belief in the "irreconcilable opposition" between art and life.

In response to Michael Salda's "What Really Happens in Cather's 'Paul's Case'?", where Salda says Paul did not kill himself, Martha Czernicki suggests, in "Fantasy and Reality in Willa Cather's 'Paul's Case'", that Paul's trip to New York is a fantasy or dream, but his suicide is not.

James Obertino of the University of Central Missouri suggests that Paul may suffer from post-traumatic stress disorder.

Hayley Wilhelm of the University of New Haven, suggests the possibility that Paul has autism due to certain signs and symptoms he displays throughout the story.

Rob Saari, in "'Paul's Case': A Narcissistic Personality Disorder", considers whether the main character, Paul, has a Narcissistic Personality Disorder. The DSM-IV essential features match the personality traits that Paul had throughout the story. Saari also suggests that because of this disorder, Paul needs to associate with people of a higher class, and that Paul "shows traits of vanity". He also talks about how difficult it is for the reader to feel bad for Paul because of how he acts in the story. When actually looking back and seeing how much Paul was struggling it's much easier to sympathize with him. Paul is clearly both unaware and unable to control the way he acts and feels. Examples Rob Sarri uses to support his claim include: Paul not caring about school and being more focused on his job, Paul stealing money from his employer to go away and live out his dream, and Paul killing himself in the end rather than confronting his reality.

David A. Carpenter, describes how Willa Cather was just starting to enjoy city life, which could be the reason "Paul's Case" and "A Wagner Matinee" were so heavily focused on cities like New York and Boston. He states "They also come when Cather is still extolling the big-city cultural life before she learned to love the bleaker environment and warmer people of the American Midwest that she later wrote about in short works and novels that made her famous".  In addition, Cather made alterations to the title, paragraph simplification, punctuation and dictation based around her state of life and surroundings 15 years after publication.  Similar alterations were made to her other works, such as "A Lost Lady" and "The Professor's House".

Adaptations
Paul's Case was adapted for television in 1980 as an episode of PBS's The American Short Story anthology series. The 54 minute presentation was directed by Lamont Johnson and starred Eric Roberts.
Paul's Case was also released as a book-on-tape by HarperCollins in 1981.
In 1986, Paul's Case was released as an audiobook by Caedmon Audio Cassette
The story was the basis for a chamber opera in two acts with music by Gregory Spears to a libretto by Spears and Kathryn Walat. It premiered in April 2013 at the Artisphere in Washington, D.C. and was then performed for the PROTOTYPE opera festival in New York City, performed at HERE, 145 6th Avenue.

See also

1905 in literature
List of suicides in fiction

References

External links 

 Full text at the Willa Cather Archive
 "Paul's Case" in: Literature Annotations
 

1905 short stories
Short stories adapted into films
Short stories by Willa Cather
Works originally published in McClure's
Short stories about suicide